Due cuori, una cappella is a 1975 Italian comedy film directed by Maurizio Lucidi.

Plot 
Aristide receives a rich inheritance of jewelry from his died mother, but when he meets a beautiful redhead at the cemetery, his life changes unexpectedly.

Cast 
Renato Pozzetto: Aristide
Agostina Belli: Claudia
Aldo Maccione: Victor
Giusi Raspani Dandolo: mother of Aristide
Leopoldo Trieste: custode del cimitero
Massimo Boldi: prete
Gianni Baghino: Tonino
Pia Morra: Speranza 
Alvaro Vitali: tassista
Mario Brega: macellaio
Ursula Andress: herself

References

External links

1975 films
Italian comedy films
1975 comedy films
Films directed by Maurizio Lucidi
Films scored by Stelvio Cipriani
1970s Italian films